John Hidalgo Moya (5 May 1920 – 3 August 1994), sometimes known as Jacko Moya, was an American-born architect who lived and worked largely in England.

Biography
Born 5 May 1920 in Los Gatos, California, US, to an English mother and Mexican father, Moya lived in England from infancy. He formed the architectural practice Powell & Moya Architect Practice with Philip Powell.

Among other projects, Powell and Moya designed Chichester Festival Theatre, the Skylon (the landmark structure of the 1951 Festival of Britain), Churchill Gardens in Pimlico, Northbrooks in Harlow, St Paul's School, London, the Museum of London, Christ Church Picture Gallery, Oxford and Wolfson College, Oxford.

Moya retired in 1992 to live in Rye, Sussex, England. He died in Hastings on 3 August 1994 age 74.

References

Further reading
 

1920 births
1994 deaths
American people of Mexican descent
Recipients of the Royal Gold Medal
20th-century American architects
American emigrants to the United Kingdom